Leopoldo Nachbin (7 January 1922 – 3 April 1993) was a Jewish-Brazilian mathematician who dealt with topology, and harmonic analysis.

Nachbin was born in Recife, and is best known for Nachbin's theorem.  He died, aged 71, in Rio de Janeiro.

Nachbin was a Ph.D. student of Laurent Schwartz.

His Ph.D. students include Francisco Antônio Dória and Seán Dineen.

He was an invited speaker at the International Congress of Mathematicians (ICM) of 1962 in Stockholm.

Bibliography
Topology and Order (Krieger Pub. Co., 1965)
Introdução à Álgebra (McGraw-Hill, 1971, in Portuguese)

References

 Ralph A. Raimi - Leopoldo Nachbin, 1922-1993.
 Candido Lima da Silva Dias, Chaim Samuel Hönig, Luis Adauto da Justa Medeiros - Leopoldo Nachbin.
 J. Horváth. The life and works of Leopoldo Nachbin.

External links
 
 Leopoldo Nachbin, 1922-1993
 Os trabalhos de Leopoldo Nachbin (1922-1993), by Jorge Mujica, in Portuguese, free translation: "The Works of Leopoldo Nachbin (1922-1993)"

20th-century Brazilian mathematicians
1922 births
1993 deaths
Brazilian Jews
Topologists
Instituto Nacional de Matemática Pura e Aplicada researchers
Mathematical analysts